Fletchamia is a genus of land planarians from Australia.

Description 
The genus Fletchamia is characterized by having an elongate and subcylindrical body with a creeping sole that occupies from 50 to 70% of the body with. The eyes form a single row around the anterior tip, are crowded antero-laterally and continue posteriorly in two to three staggered rows. The parenchymal musculature is weak and includes a loose ring zone of circulo-oblique fibers and a weak ventral plate of longitudinal fibers. The copulatory apparatus lacks a permanent penis, but some species may have a rudimentary penis papilla. The female atrium communicates posteriorly with a diverticulum.

Etymology 
The name Fletchamia is a portmanteau of the surnames of Joseph James Fletcher (Fletc-) and Alexander Greenlaw Hamilton (-hami-) and commemorates their contributions to the knowledge of Australian land planarians.

Species 
The genus Fletchamia includes the following species:
Fletchamia dakini (Dendy, 1915)
Fletchamia flavilineata (Dendy, 1915)
Fletchamia fuscodorsalis (Steel, 1901)
Fletchamia mediolineata (Dendy, 1891)
Fletchamia mmahoni (Dendy, 1891)
Fletchamia quinquelineata (J. J. Fletcher & A. G. Hamilton, 1888)
Fletchamia sugdeni (Dendy, 1891)

References 

Geoplanidae
Rhabditophora genera